Háy is a Hungarian surname. Notable people with the surname include:
 
Gyula Háy (1900–1975), Hungarian communist leader
László Háy (1893–1975), Hungarian economist
Peter Háy (author) (born 1944), Canadian author, son of Gyula Háy

Hungarian-language surnames